Preußentum und Sozialismus ("Prussianism and Socialism") is a book by Oswald Spengler published in 1919 that addressed the connection of the Prussian character with right-wing socialism.

Spengler responded to the claim that socialism's rise in Germany had not begun with the Marxist rebellions of 1918 to 1919, but rather in 1914 when Germany waged war, uniting the German nation in a national struggle that he claimed was based on socialistic Prussian characteristics, including creativity, discipline, concern for the greater good, productivity, and self-sacrifice. Spengler claimed that these socialistic Prussian qualities were present across Germany and stated that the merger of German nationalism with this form of socialism while resisting Marxist and internationalist socialism would be in the interests of Germany.

Spengler's Prussian socialism was popular amongst the German political right, especially the revolutionary right who had distanced themselves from traditional conservatism. His notions of Prussian socialism influenced Nazism and the Conservative Revolutionary movement.

Concepts
Spengler utilized the anti-English ideas addressed by Johann Plenge and Werner Sombart during World War I that condemned English liberalism and English parliamentarianism while advocating a national socialism that was free from Marxism that would connect the individual to the state through corporative organization.

Prussian character and socialism

Spengler claimed that socialistic Prussian characteristics existed across Germany that included creativity, discipline, concern for the greater good, productivity, and self-sacrifice.
Spengler described socialism outside of a class conflict perspective and said "The meaning of socialism is that life is controlled not by the opposition between rich and poor, but by the rank that achievement and talent bestow. That is our freedom, freedom from the economic despotism of the individual." Spengler addressed the need of Germans to accept Prussian socialism to free themselves from foreign forms of government:

Spengler went further to demonstrate the difference between England's capitalist nature and Prussian socialism by saying:

Spengler claimed that Frederick William I of Prussia became the "first conscious socialist" for having founded Prussian tradition of military and bureaucratic discipline. Spengler claimed that Otto von Bismarck pursued Prussian socialism through his implementation of social policy that complemented his conservative policies rather than contradicted them as claimed by others.

Rebuke of Marxism and definition of "true socialism"
Spengler denounced Marxism for having developed socialism from an English perspective, while not understanding Germans' socialist nature.  In the pamphlet, a central argument is that the corrupt forces promoting English socialism in his country comprised an "invisible English army, which Napoleon had left behind on German soil after the Battle of Jena."

Spengler accused Marxism of following the British tradition in which the poor envy the rich. He claimed that Marxism sought to train the proletariat to "expropriate the expropriator", the capitalist, so that the proletariat could live a life of leisure on this expropriation. In summary, Spengler concluded that "Marxism is the capitalism of the working class" and not true socialism.

In contrast to Marxism, Spengler claimed that "true socialism" in its German form "does not mean nationalization through expropriation or robbery." Spengler justified this claim by saying:

True socialism according to Spengler would take the form of a corporatism in which "local corporate bodies organized according to the importance of each occupation to the people as a whole; higher representation in stages up to a supreme council of the state; mandates revocable at any time; no organized parties, no professional politicians, no periodic elections."

Criticism 
Historian Ishay Landa has described the nature of "Prussian socialism" as decidedly capitalist. For Landa, Spengler strongly opposed labor strikes, trade unions, progressive taxation or any imposition of taxes on the rich, any shortening of the working day, as well as any form of government insurance for sickness, old age, accidents, or unemployment. At the same time as he rejected any social democratic provisions, Spengler celebrated private property, competition, imperialism, capital accumulation, and "wealth, collected in few hands and among the ruling classes". Landa describes Spengler's "Prussian Socialism" as "working a whole lot, for the absolute minimum, but — and this is a vital aspect — being happy about it."

According to the German sociologist Stefan Breuer, Spengler was reconciling socialist vocabulary with concepts that were fundamentally liberal, namely Manchester liberal. Spengler's trick was to declare socialism to be a form of will to power. Spengler believed the workers' movement and the socialism they represented caused global economic crisis and mass unemployment and that the direct result of this worker socialism led to wage dictates and "tax Bolshevism" everywhere in the industrialized countries and ruined the entrepreneurs.

Breuer describes in the view of this assignment, "it is not surprising that the genuine, ie Prussian Socialism proclaimed by Spengler had extremely liberal features" and "this socialism presupposed a private economy with its old-Germanic joy in power."

References

External links
Prussianism and Socialism – English translation of the full text on the Internet Archive

Books about nationalism
Books about socialism
Conservative Revolutionary movement
German nationalism
Nazism
Books about politics of Germany
Books in political philosophy
Paternalistic conservatism
Syncretic political movements
Works by Oswald Spengler
1919 non-fiction books
Right-wing anti-capitalism